Cenk Işler (born 25 February 1974) is a retired Turkish international footballer who played as a forward.

Professional career
Cenk spent his entire senior career in Turkey. He was a journeyman who played for various clubs, notably Samsunspor on four occasions, and is one of the few players in Süper Lig to score over 100 career goals.

International career
Cenk was born in Germany to parents of Turkish descent. He made one appearance for the Turkey national football team in a 2-0 win over Moldova in 2 September 2000.

References

External links

1974 births
Living people
Turkish footballers
Turkey international footballers
Süper Lig players
Samsunspor footballers
Ünyespor footballers
Adanaspor footballers
İstanbulspor footballers
Konyaspor footballers
MKE Ankaragücü footballers
Antalyaspor footballers
Manisaspor footballers
Kasımpaşa S.K. footballers
Bucaspor footballers
German people of Turkish descent
Association football forwards